The Gulf of Tunis is a large Mediterranean bay in north-eastern Tunisia, extending for  from Cape Farina in the west to Cape Bon in the east. Tunis, the capital city of Tunisia, lies at the south-western edge of the Gulf, as have a series of settled places over the last three millennia.

The central part of the gulf, corresponding to the city of Tunis, is favorable to the implementation of a commercial port due to its location of being a well protected area. The famous city of Carthage was built on the gulf shores.

References

Tunis
Tunis